Jason Marcelo Elame (born 4 January 1982 in Yaoundé) is a Cameroonian football defender who currently plays for Vereya Stara Zagora.

Career
He moved with teammate Daniel Bekono in January 2004 from Fovu Baham to Bulgarian side PFC Beroe Stara Zagora, from July 2006 to June 2007 he was loaned out to Lokomotiv Plovdiv and played 25 games. After 1 year he returned to Beroe Stz. He left Beroe in July 2008 and moved to FC Vihren Sandanski. He also holds a Bulgarian passport.

External links

Profile
Scorezz Profile

1982 births
Living people
Cameroonian footballers
Cameroon international footballers
First Professional Football League (Bulgaria) players
Association football defenders
Fovu Baham players
PFC Beroe Stara Zagora players
PFC Lokomotiv Plovdiv players
OFC Vihren Sandanski players
PFC Nesebar players
Expatriate footballers in Bulgaria
Cameroonian expatriates in Bulgaria